Lisa Redfield Peattie (1924–2018) was an American anthropologist and professor of urban anthropology at the Massachusetts Institute of Technology.  She was best known for her work in advocacy planning, a type of urban planning which seeks social change by including all interests and groups in the planning process. Peattie, who earned her Ph.D. from University of Chicago in 1968, published extensively on slums and squatter settlements. She also engaged in numerous peace actions, and had a long, although minor and nonviolent, arrest record.

Biography
Born in Chicago, she was brought up partly in Mexico, in Morelos and Yucatán, where her parents Robert Redfield and Margaret Park Redfield were conducting fieldwork. Her grandfather, Robert E. Park, was an American urban sociologist who worked with Booker T Washington (with whom he shared a fascination with cities and the theory of cities) at the Tuskegee Institute. Together they searched for "The Man Farthest Down". He later taught at the University of Chicago on the theory of urban ecology. Her father was an anthropologist, also at the University of Chicago, had an interest in tracing connections – between archaeology, anthropological linguistics, physical anthropology, cultural anthropology, and ethnology in a synthesis of disciplines and between village cultures in his fieldwork.

She began her anthropological life in 1948 with the Fox Project, which began as a summer of fieldwork for six Chicago graduate students, at Meskwaki Settlement in Iowa, and which, with the encouragement of Sol Tax, became a decade-long effort to redefine anthropology not as pure science, but as part of the human and moral landscape, in what he called "action anthropology", and which was later to reappear in her urban planning work as "advocacy planning".

In 1943 she married Roderick Elia Peattie. She published two children’s books with him: The Law and The City, which began her lifelong study of cities.

In 1962 Lisa and Roderick Peattie were hired by the Harvard–MIT Joint Center for Urban Studies, under a contract with the Venezuelan government, as project anthropologist and architect respectively, to help plan the city of Guayana, near the junction of the Orinoco and the Caroni rivers in the interior of Venezuela. They were the only members of the team to live on the site; the rest of the design team worked on the project from the capitol, Caracas, 660 km away. She observed directly the effects of the then-new profession of Urban Planning as it was experienced by the planned-upon population; she reported this radicalizing experience in her first popular book: The View from the Barrio.

Roderick Peattie died in Venezuela, in a car accident in 1963. Lisa Peattie returned to the United States, where she taught urban planning at MIT until her retirement.

In 1966 she, with other faculty and students of M.I.T. and Harvard, organized Urban Planning Aid. This organization was to offer assistance to local residents against highway construction, and housing problems. It took an active part in the urban renewal fights and the Freeway and expressway revolts of the 1960s and 1970s. In the course of these anti-development struggles, she began a study and critique of conventional economic theory, which was strongly pro-development.

She inspired activists in such widely varied subjects as poverty and conviviality. She also was involved in the Homeless Empowerment Project, and in the creation of "Spare Change News", a street newspaper whose mission is "to present, by our own example, that homeless and economically disadvantaged people, with the proper resources, empowerment, opportunity, and encouragement are capable of creating change for ourselves in society." She also became involved in the fight against nuclear arms.

Awards
 ACSP Distinguished Educator Award (1999)

Books and articles
 
 
 
 
"Women's Claims: A Study in Political Economy (The Library of Political Economy)", with Martin Rein, Oxford University Press, 1983

References

External links

 Lisa's Life, Lisa Peattie blog

2018 deaths
Urban sociologists
American anthropologists
American activists
MIT School of Architecture and Planning faculty
University of Chicago alumni
1924 births
American expatriates in Mexico